150 may refer to:

150 (number), a natural number
AD 150, a year in the 2nd century AD
150 BC, a year in the 2nd century BC
150 Regiment RLC
Combined Task Force 150

See also
 List of highways numbered 150